State Highway 67 (SH 67) is a Texas state highway that runs between Breckenridge and Graham.

History

The route was originally designated on August 21, 1923 along renumbered portions of SH 22, SH 18, and SH 2 extending from Graham to Breckenridge, then southeast from Breckenridge, reaching the southern end of Waco. On July 31, 1929, SH 67 was to be rerouted away from Carlton and through Clairette and Alexander instead if bonds were voted. On December 17, 1929, it was rerouted away from Carlton and through Clairette and Alexander instead. On September 26, 1945 the section from Breckenridge to Waco was transferred to SH 6. Part became U.S. Highway 183 (US 183) and SH 69 (later SH 112). On May 6, 1974, SH 67 was relocated in Graham over a new route and a portion of FM 61.
SH 67A was a spur which was designated on April 27, 1925 from SH 67 in Breckenridge to Woodson. It was extended on January 16, 1928 to Throckmorton. On March 19, 1930, this was renumbered as SH 157 (later SH 6, now US 183).

Major intersections

References

External links

067
Transportation in Stephens County, Texas
Transportation in Young County, Texas